Sir Andrew Beattie (6 August 1860 – 19 November 1923) was an Irish politician and public servant.

Beattie was born in Rathfriland, County Down. For many years, both before and after the creation of the Irish Free State, he led the Unionist group on the Dublin City Council, of which he was an Alderman. He was also High Sheriff of Dublin, a Deputy Lieutenant for the City of Dublin, Commissioner of National Education for Ireland, and a Senator of the short-lived Parliament of Southern Ireland. He unsuccessfully contested the seat of West Down in the Parliament of the United Kingdom three times as an Independent Unionist.

Beattie stood for election to the 4th Dáil in the 1923 general election as an Independent candidate in Dublin South. He failed to win election by a margin of 490 votes less than anti-Treaty Sinn Féin candidate Charles Murphy.

He was the most prominent Presbyterian politician in Dublin and was a member of Ormond Quay Presbyterian Church.

He was knighted in the 1920 New Year Honours for his services to Dublin and was appointed to the Privy Council of Ireland in the 1921 New Year Honours, entitling him to the style "The Right Honourable".

Footnotes

1860 births
1923 deaths
People from County Down
Irish knights
Irish Presbyterians
Knights Bachelor
Politicians awarded knighthoods
Members of the Privy Council of Ireland
Irish Unionist Party politicians
Local councillors in Dublin (city)
Deputy Lieutenants of Dublin (city)
Members of the Senate of Southern Ireland
High Sheriffs of Dublin City